Zazen Produções is a Brazilian company of movie productions founded in 1997 by Marcos Prado and José Padilha.

Zazen have their films distributed in Theaters and TV for various countries by companies such as IM Global, Universal Pictures, Paramount Pictures, The Weinstein Company, HBO, National Geographic, ARTE France, BBC, NHK, ThinkFilm, RioFilme, SIC Portugal and Canal Brasil, among others.

Filmmaking 
 O Mecanismo (Netflix) (2018)
 Paraísos Artificiais (filme) (2012)
 Tropa de Elite 2 (2010)
 Nunca Antes na História Desse País (2009)
 Água (2009)
 68 Destinos (2009)
 Paraísos Artificiais (2009)
 Garapa (2008)
 Tropa de Elite (2007)
 Um Buda (2005)
 Estamira (2004)
 Ônibus 174 (2002)

References

External links 
  

Film production companies of Brazil
Companies based in Rio de Janeiro (city)